The Carlos Palanca Memorial Awards for Literature winners in 1965 (rank, title of winning entry, name of author).


English division
Short story
First prize: "Doña Jeronima" by Nick Joaquin
Second prize: "The Enchanted Plant" by Bienvenido Santos
Third prize: "Naked Song" by Almatita Tayo

Poetry
First prize: "Godkissing Carrion" by Epifanio San Juan Jr.
Second prize: "A Group of Poems" by Emmanuel Torres
Third prize: "A Group of Poems" by Valdemar Olaguer

One-act play
First prize: "No Sadder Race" by Nestor Torre Jr.
Second prize: "The Mouth is an Open Wound" by Jesus T. Peralta
Third prize: "Lust is a Four-letter Word" by Mar V. Puatu

Filipino division
Short story
First prize: "Landas sa Bahaghari" by Benjamin P. Pascual
Second prize: "Kamatayan sa Dilim at Ulan" by Eli Ang Barroso
Third prize: "Mga Luha ni Leila" by Bayani De Leon

Poetry
First prize: "Sa Pagkaparool" by Ruben Vega
Second prize: "Mga Sugat ng Siglo" by Teo S. Baylen
Third prize: "Makiling" by Gonzalo Flores

One-act play
First prize: Mga Yagit" by Edgardo M. Reyes
Second prize: "Maskara" by Pablo M. Cuasay
Third prize: "Ang Taksil" by Agapito M. Joaquin

References
 

Palanca Awards
1965 literary awards